Abigail Spears and CoCo Vandeweghe were the defending champions, but chose not to participate this year.

Latisha Chan and Květa Peschke won the title, defeating Lyudmyla and Nadiia Kichenok in the final, 6–4, 6–1.

Seeds

Draw

Draw

External links
Main draw

Silicon Valley Classic - Doubles
Silicon Valley Classic